Martin Howard Perper (August 6, 1939 – November 21, 1999) was an American politician who served two terms as a Republican member of the Virginia House of Delegates. In 1976, he ran for the United States Senate as an Independent Republican.

References

External links 
 

1939 births
1999 deaths
Republican Party members of the Virginia House of Delegates
20th-century American politicians